Dorais may refer to:

 Dorais Park, Detroit, Michigan
 Dorais Velodrome, formerly abandoned, outdoor velodrome part of Dorais Park

People 
 Andrew "Andy" Dorais (b. 1982), American ski mountaineer
 Benoit Dorais, city councillor from Montreal, Quebec, Canada
 Charles Emile "Gus" Dorais (1891–1954), American football player 
 Jason Dorais (b. 1982), American ski mountaineer
 Louis-Tréfflé Dorais (1835–1907), merchant and political figure in Quebec